The 82nd Operations Group (82 OG) is an inactive United States Air Force unit. It was last assigned to the 82nd Training Wing, stationed at Williams Air Force Base, Arizona. It was inactivated on 31 March 1993.

The Group's history goes back to January 1942, when the War Department constituted the 82nd Pursuit Group (Interceptor).

History

World War II
The history of the 82nd Operations Group goes back to 13 January 1942, when the War Department constituted the 82nd Pursuit Group (Interceptor).

The 82nd was activated at Harding Field, Baton Rouge, Louisiana on 9 February 1942. From February 1942 to 9 September 1945, the primary components of the group were the 95th, 96th and 97th Pursuit (later Fighter) Squadrons.

At the end of April 1942 when it had sufficient personnel and equipment, the 82nd moved to Muroc Army Air Field, California, and started formation flying and gunnery and bombing training with Lockheed P-38 Lightning aircraft. Half of the first class of flying sergeant enlisted pilots served with the 82nd. In May the War Department redesignated the unit as the 82nd Fighter Group (Two Engine). The group left California in September and arrived in Northern Ireland in October where it received additional training. At about the same time, the Allies launched their invasion of French North Africa. By December 1942, Axis forces had repelled the Allied advance, and the long winter campaign had begun. It was at this time that the 82nd Fighter Group moved to North Africa to serve with Twelfth Air Force.

Between Christmas and New Year’s Day, the 82nd operated from Tafaraoui Airfield, Algeria, to protect two convoys in an anti-submarine patrol. On 1 January 1943, the air echelon moved to Telergma Airport, Algeria, where it was joined by the ground echelon in February 1943.

The 82nd soon distinguished itself in dogfights with enemy fighters while escorting bombers over Gabes, Sfax, Tunis, Bizerte, Kairouan, Sardinia, and other points. On 20 March 1943, while escorting North American B-25 Mitchells in a sea search off Cape Bon, a group of P-38s engaged the enemy in an air battle. Even though they were outnumbered by 50 enemy fighters, the 82nd emerged with 11 confirmed kills, 2 probables, and 2 damaged, while not losing a single bomber.

In April 1943, the group moved to Tunis to take part in the final phase of the Tunisian Campaign. On 11 April it destroyed 32 Junkers Ju 52s during a fighter sweep against enemy transport planes that were coming from Italy to supply the crumbling Afrika Korps. The group scored hits on 14 April during a bombing mission on a large transport off Cape Zebid and on 8 May executed a bombing attack on the airdrome at Pantelleria.

The Tunisian campaign ended in May 1943. Between December 1942 and May 1943, the 82nd Fighter Group flew 152 combat missions and 2,439 combat sorties. While escorting B-25, B-26, and B-17 bombers on 1,880 sorties, the group encountered 751 enemy aircraft, destroyed 199 of them, and lost 64 P-38s.

From July to August 1943, the 82nd engaged in the Allied invasion of Sicily while supporting bomber raids against Naples on 17 July and participating in the first raid on Rome on 19 July. It flew 191 combat missions in this period. The missions amounted to 3,335 combat sorties; escorted 2,987 B-25 and 382 B-26s; and engaged in 57 skip and dive bombing attacks. [Needs clarification.] The 82nd destroyed 78 enemy planes, had 17 probables, and damaged 56, while losing only 11 P-38s. On 25 August, it conducted a low level strafing attack against enemy aircraft concentrations at Foggia, Italy for which it received a Distinguished Unit Citation(DUC). Just over a week later, the group was awarded a second DUC for its actions in protecting a group of bombers that encountered strong enemy opposition in an attack on marshalling yards near Naples.

During the invasion of Italy by the United States Fifth Army, between 6 and 18 September 1943, the group patrolled the beachhead at Salerno where the pilots flew a round-the-clock schedule, dive-bombing enemy transports, communications, and gun positions. They also flew low altitude reconnaissance missions through the Foggia area reporting crucial enemy activities.

The movement of the 82nd to Italy and its assignment to Fifteenth Air Force was part of the airpower buildup to provide fighter protection for the bombers of the Fifteenth Air Force, when they strafed and bombed Axis oil targets. From January 1944 until May 1945, the P-38s of the 82nd Fighter Group struck oil centers at Ploiești in Romania, Blechhammer in Poland, Vienna in Austria, Dubova in Czechoslovakia, as well as in Hungary, France, and Yugoslavia. On 10 June 1944, the 82nd participated in one of the most daring strikes of the war, bombing the Romano-Americano oil refineries at Ploiești, the most heavily defended target on the continent. The group was awarded a third DUC for this mission, in which it braved head-on attacks by enemy interceptors.

The 82nd engaged in another spectacular episode when it used a single-seat fighter aircraft for the first time to rescue a downed fighter pilot on enemy soil. On 4 August 1944, while on a strafing mission against the airdrome at Focsani, Rumania, the aircraft flown by Capt E. Willsie was hit by ground fire. A veteran of 60 missions, Willsie radioed his position to the formation, crash-landed his plane, demolished it, and then hitched a ride in the lap of Second Lieutenant Richard T. Andrews, who had landed his P-38 in a pasture to rescue Willsie.

When the war in Europe ended in May 1945, the 82nd Fighter Group remained in Italy until it was inactivated on 9 September 1945.

Strategic Air Command
On 12 April 1947, the War Department activated the 82nd Fighter Group at Grenier Field in New Hampshire, and assigned it to Strategic Air Command (SAC).

The group was outfitted with F-51 Mustang aircraft, and it trained in long range fighter and fighter escort operations. A few months later the Air Force decided to test the wing-base (Hobson Plan) organization. Under this plan, combat wings were established. On 15 August, the 82nd Fighter Group became a subordinate component of the 82nd Fighter Wing. The test continued until 1 August 1948, by which time the Air Force had decided to adopt this type of organization as its standard. As a result, on 1 August, the 82nd Fighter Wing was discontinued, and the Air Force activated a permanent 82nd Fighter Wing, still with the 82nd Fighter Group assigned as a subordinate organization. In August 1949, the wing and its components were transferred from SAC to Continental Air Command.The group continued to operate at Grenier until its inactivation on 2 October 1949.

Air Defense Command

In 1955, the Air Force redesignated the unit as the 82nd Fighter Group (Air Defense) and activated it at New Castle Airport, DE, where it assumed the personnel and equipment of the inactivating 525th Air Defense Group as part of Air Defense Command's Project Arrow, which was designed to bring back on the active list the fighter units which had compiled memorable records in the two world wars. It was assigned to Air Defense Command (ADC)'s 4710th Air Defense Wing. Its operational squadrons were the 96th Fighter-Interceptor Squadron, which was transferred from the 525th Air Defense Group, and the 97th FIS, which moved from Wright-Patterson AFB, OH without personnel or equipment and replaced the 332nd FIS, since another goal of Project Arrow was to reunited fighter squadrons with their traditional headquarters. Both Squadrons flew F-94C Starfire interceptors. Its primary mission was to provide air defense for the northeastern United States. It also acted as the host base organization for the USAF portion of New Castle Airport and was assigned several support units to fulfil this mission. In 1957, it was announced that Air Defense Command would be reducing its forces, and the 82nd FIG was inactivated on 8 January 1958.

Williams AFB 1991-1993
On 15 December 1991, the group was redesignated as the 82nd Operations Group (82nd OG) and activated at Williams AFB, AZ as a result of the 82 Flying Training Wing implementing the USAF objective wing organization. The 82nd OG was assigned all the flying units of the 82nd Flying Training Wing. In 1991 Congress approved the second round of base closures, as identified by the Base Realignment and Closure Commission. On that list was Williams AFB. The base was to cease operation as of 30 September 1993. As a result, the 82nd Operations Group was inactivated on 31 March 1993.

Lineage
 Constituted as the 82nd Pursuit Group (Interceptor) on 13 January 1942
 Activated on 9 February 1942
 Redesignated as the 82nd Fighter Group (Two Engine) on 15 May 1942
 Inactivated in Italy on 9 September 1945.
 Redesignated as the 82nd Fighter Group, Single Engine 1947
 Activated on 12 April 1947
 Inactivated on 2 October 1949
 Redesignated as 82nd Fighter Group (Air Defense) on 20 June 1955
 Activated on 18 August 1955
 Inactivated on 30 June 1958
 Redesignated as 82nd Operations Group and activated on 15 December 1991
 Inactivated on 31 March 1993

Assignments

 Fourth Air Force, 9 February – September 1942
 Eighth Air Force, September – December 1942
 7th Fighter Wing: ca. November – ca. 31 December 1942
 Twelfth Air Force, December 1942 – February 1943
 Attached to 7th Fighter Wing: 1–17 February 1943
 7th Fighter Wing (later 47th Bombardment Wing): 17 February 1943 – 13 January 1944
 5th Bombardment Wing: 13 January 1944 – 27 March 1944

 306th Fighter Wing: 27 March 1944 – 13 June 1945
 305th Bombardment Wing: 3 September 1945 – 9 September 1945
 82nd Fighter Wing, 15 August 1947 – 2 October 1949
 4710th Air Defense Wing, 18 August 1955 – 1 March 1956
 37th Air Division, 1 March 1956 – 30 June 1958
 82nd Training Wing, 15 December 1991 – 31 March 1993

Components

Operational Squadrons
 95th Fighter Squadron, 9 February 1942 – 9 September 1945; 12 April 1947 – 2 October 1949
 96th Fighter (later Fighter-Interceptor, Training) Squadron, 9 February 1942 – 9 September 1945; 12 April 1947 – 2 October 1949; 18 August 1955 – 8 January 1958; 15 December 1991 – 31 March 1993
 97th Fighter (later Fighter-Interceptor, Training) Squadron, 9 February 1942 – 9 September 1945; 12 April 1947 – 2 October 1949; 18 August 1955 – 8 January 1958; 15 December 1991 – 31 March 1993
 98th Flying Training Squadron 15 December 1991 – 26 June 1992
 99th Flying Training Squadron 15 December 1991 – 31 March 1993

Support Units
 82nd USAF Infirmary (later 82nd USAF Dispensary), 18 August 1955 – 8 January 1958
 82nd Air Base Squadron, 18 August 1955 – 30 June 1958
 82nd Consolidated Aircraft Maintenance Squadron, 8 August 1957 – 30 June 1958
 82nd Materiel Squadron, 18 August 1955 – 30 June 1958

Stations

 Harding Field, Louisiana 9 February 1942
 Muroc AAF, California 30 April 1942
 Los Angeles AAF, California May 1942
 Grand Central Air Terminal, Glendale, California, ca. 16 August – 16 September 1942
 RAF Eglington, Northern Ireland October 1942
 Telergma Airfield, Algeria January 1943
 Berteaux Airfield, Algeria 28 March 1943
 Souk-el-Arba Airfield, Algeria 13 June 1943
 Grombalia Airfield, Tunisia 3 August 1943

 San Pancrazio Airfield, Italy c. 3 October 1943
 Lecce Airfield, Italy 10 October 1943
 Vincenzo Airfield, Italy 11 January 1944
 Foggia, Italy Summer 1944 – Summer 1945
 Lesina Airfield, Italy ca. 30 August – September 1945
 Grenier Field (later Grenier Air Force Base), New Hampshire 12 April 1947 – 2 October 1949
 New Castle County Airport, Delaware, 6 February 1952 – 30 June 1958
 Williams AFB, Arizona, 15 December 1991 – 31 March 1993

Awards and Campaigns

Aircraft assigned
 Lockheed P-38 Lightning, (1942–1945)
 North American P/F-51 Mustang, (1947–1949)
 Lockheed F-94 Starfire, (1955–1958)
 Cessna T-37 Tweet, (1991–1992)
 Northrop T-38 Talon, (1991–1993)

References

Notes

Bibliography

 
 
 
 

Further reading

External links
 AFHRA Factsheet, 95th Fighter Squadron (accessed 16 May 2012)

082